The 1995–96 Kategoria e Dytë was the 49th season of a second-tier association football league in Albania.

Group A

Group B

Final

References

 Giovanni Armillotta

Kategoria e Parë seasons
2
Alba